Sir William Francis Birch  (born 9 April 1934), usually known as Bill Birch, is a New Zealand retired politician. He served as Minister of Finance from 1993 to 1999 in the fourth National Government.

Early life
Birch was born in Hastings on 9 April 1934, the son of Charles and Elizabeth Birch. He was educated at Hamilton's Technical High School and through Wellington Technical Correspondence School. He was trained as a surveyor, and established a business in Pukekohe, a small town south of Auckland. Birch quickly became involved in various Pukekohe community organisations. He served on Pukehohe's borough council from 1965 to 1974, and was deputy mayor from 1968 to 1974.

In 1953, Birch married Rosa Mitchell, and the couple went on to have four children.

Member of Parliament

The name and shape of Birch's electorates changed regularly as required by post-New Zealand census boundary adjustments. Over Birch's career, the extreme borders of his electorate sometimes extended as far as north as Beachlands, as far west as Pirongia Mountain and as far east as Thames (though never all at once). However, no matter the name, Birch's electorate always included the town of Pukekohe.

After his retirement in 1999, he was succeeded by Paul Hutchison as MP for Port Waikato.

Third National Government, 1975–1984
Birch's initial term of Parliament was in Opposition, but under leader and finance spokesperson Robert Muldoon, the National Party won the following three elections and formed the Third National Government. After holding a number of internal National Party positions in his first six years as an MP, including senior whip from 1976 to 1979, Birch was made Minister of National Development, Minister of Energy, and Minister of Science and Technology when National won its second term in government at the 1978 election.

As a minister in the Third National Government, Birch supported the Government's dawn raids against overstayers, which disproportionately targeted the Pasifika community. In response the Polynesian Panthers activist group staged "counter raids" on the homes of Birch and the Minister of Immigration Frank Gill, surrounding them with light and chanting with megaphones. As Minister of Energy during the 1979 oil crisis, Birch oversaw the introduction of temporary petrol demand reduction measures including carless days and the ban on petrol sales during weekends.

After the 1981 election, he swapped the Science and Technology role for the Regional Development portfolio. As Minister for National Development, Birch was closely involved in the Think Big project, a series of high-cost programmes designed to reduce New Zealand's dependence on imported fuel.

Opposition, 1984–1990
Muldoon kept Birch on in the Energy and National Development portfolios when he announced his shadow cabinet in July 1984. He then was one of four ex-ministers who challenged Muldoon for the leadership of the party which resulted in Jim McLay becoming leader. McLay promoted Birch to replace Muldoon in the finance portfolio and third rank in the party caucus. McLay later dumped Birch as finance spokesman in an attempt to "rejuvenate" the party and instead allocated him the job of spokesperson for Labour and Employment and the twelfth rank. This motivated Birch to support a successful challenge to McLay a month later. Under new leader Jim Bolger, Birch returned to his position as third-ranked in caucus and retained the Labour and Employment portfolios. In the second opposition term, from 1987 to 1990, he was additionally the spokesperson for immigration and state services.

Fourth National Government, 1990–1996
Over the next three years, he was to hold a number of ministerial roles, including Minister of Labour, Minister of Immigration, Minister of Pacific Island Affairs, Minister of Employment, Minister of Health, Minister of State Services, and Minister responsible for the ACC. As Minister of Labour, Birch introduced the Employment Contracts Act, which radically liberalised the labour market, most noticeably by reducing the power of trade unions by removing their monopoly on worker representation.

In 1992, Birch was made a member of the Privy Council of the United Kingdom, an honour reserved for senior New Zealand politicians. Between 1992 and 1996 Birch was known as the "Minister of Everything" in acknowledgement that Prime Minister Jim Bolger relied heavily on Birch's capacity and ability for resolving problems.

During this period, Birch clashed a number of times with the controversial Minister of Finance, Ruth Richardson. The Prime Minister, Jim Bolger, had never been a supporter of Richardson's strong laissez-faire policies, and preferred the more conservative Birch for the Finance portfolio.

Birch's appointment to the Finance portfolio raised eyebrows, given Birch's association with the Think Big projects. However, he soon developed a reputation for a frugal finance minister, delivering a succession of balanced budgets. He also privatised a number of state assets.

National-New Zealand First Coalition Government, 1996–1999
New Zealand First's leader, Winston Peters, insisted on control of the Finance role as part of the coalition agreement, and National eventually agreed. The Minister of Finance role was split into two separate offices. The senior position was given the title "Treasurer" and was assigned to Peters; Birch retained the title of Minister of Finance and its remaining responsibilities. Some, however, have voiced the opinion that whatever the official arrangement may have been, Birch still performed most of the job's key functions. Mike Moore of the Labour Party commented that "we are always impressed when Winston Peters answers questions, because Bill Birch's lips do not move."

During the compilation of the coalition agreement between National and New Zealand First, Birch added the proviso to almost every page that "All funding proposals subject to being considered within the agreed spending policy parameters" which essentially rendered every policy agreement provisional, much to Peters' annoyance. When the coalition with New Zealand First broke down, Birch took over the role of Treasurer. For a short period he held both financial offices until Bill English was promoted to be Minister of Finance, leaving Birch with the senior role. In the middle of 1999, as part of the preparations for Birch's planned retirement, Birch and English were swapped. English became the Treasurer and Birch served once again as Minister of Finance.

Retirement
Birch retired from Parliament at the 1999 general election. His wife, Rosa, Lady Birch, died in Pukekohe on 22 June 2015.

In 2020 his biography, Bill Birch: Minister of Everything, written by Brad Tattersfield was published.

Honours and awards
Birch was awarded the Queen Elizabeth II Silver Jubilee Medal in 1977, and the New Zealand 1990 Commemoration Medal in 1990. In the 1999 Queen's Birthday Honours, he was appointed a Knight Grand Companion of the New Zealand Order of Merit, for public services as a Member of Parliament and Minister of the Crown.

Notes

References

|-

|-

|-

|-

|-

|-

|-

|-

|-

1934 births
Living people
New Zealand finance ministers
New Zealand National Party MPs
New Zealand MPs for North Island electorates
People from Hastings, New Zealand
Members of the New Zealand House of Representatives
People from Pukekohe
Knights Grand Companion of the New Zealand Order of Merit
New Zealand members of the Privy Council of the United Kingdom
Local politicians in New Zealand
21st-century New Zealand politicians
New Zealand politicians awarded knighthoods
Deputy mayors of places in New Zealand